Onozawa (written: 小野沢, 小野澤 or 斧澤) is a Japanese surname. Notable people with the surname include:

, Japanese volleyball player
, Japanese rugby union player
, Japanese handball player
, Japanese speed skater
, Japanese footballer

Fictional characters
, a character in the anime series Tokyo Magnitude 8.0

Japanese-language surnames